Kuangshan Township is a rural township in Lengshuijiang, Loudi City, Hunan Province, People's Republic of China.

Administrative division
The township is divided into 15 villages and 1 community, the following areas: Tanjia Community, Baiyun Village, Chuanshan Village, Dongxia Village, Fanjia Village, Gaofeng Village, Guanjia Village, Hexing Village, Hengyuan Village, Laifeng Village, Longhushan Village, Majing Village, Shuituo Village, Xinsheng Village, Zhangmu Village, and Zhushan Village (谭家社区、白云村、船山村、洞下村、樊家村、高峰村、官家村、合兴村、恒元村、来风村、龙虎山村、马井村、水托村、新生村、樟木村、竹山村).
Historic township-level divisions of Lengshuijiang